Zhou Jiawei (born 23 August 1983) is a national-record-holding swimmer from China. He set the Asian Record in the long-course 50m butterfly (23.43) at the 2009 Chinese Nationals; and set the Chinese Record also in the long-course 100 butterfly (51.24) at the 2009 Chinese National Games.

Born in Guangdong, Zhou has swum for China at the:
Asian Games: 2006, 2010
World Championships: 2007, 2009
2009 Asian Swimming Championships

At the 2006 Asian Games, he finished 4th place in the 100 butterfly (53.24). At the 2010 Asian Games, he won both the 50 and 100 butterfly events.

See also
China at the 2012 Summer Olympics - Swimming

References

External links 
 
 
 
 

1983 births
Living people
Chinese male butterfly swimmers
Swimmers from Guangzhou
Swimmers at the 2012 Summer Olympics
Olympic swimmers of China
Asian Games medalists in swimming
Swimmers at the 2006 Asian Games
Swimmers at the 2010 Asian Games
Asian Games gold medalists for China
Medalists at the 2010 Asian Games
Medalists at the 2006 Asian Games
20th-century Chinese people
21st-century Chinese people